This list of botanical gardens and arboretums in Indiana is intended to include all significant botanical gardens and arboretums in the U.S. state of Nebraska

See also
List of botanical gardens and arboretums in the United States

References 

 
Arboreta in Nebraska
botanical gardens and arboretums in Nebraska